Soko Airport  is an airport serving Bondoukou, Côte d'Ivoire.

See also
Transport in Côte d'Ivoire

References

 OurAirports - Bondoukou
  Great Circle Mapper - Bondoukou
 Google Earth

Airports in Ivory Coast
Buildings and structures in Zanzan District
Gontougo